Enrique Riveros Fernandez (1906–1954), was a Chilean actor who worked primarily in films in France, most notably with directors Jean Renoir and Jean Cocteau, before retiring from the screen and moving back to Chile to raise his children.

Early life and career
Riveros was born in San Fernando, Chile, the eldest son of prominent businessman Enrique Riveros and Mrs. Hortensia Fernández Prado. As a teenager he traveled to Paris in 1922 to study agronomy, but promptly and against his family's wishes, became involved in the Parisian art world and avant-garde film scene of the era, mingling with: Picasso, ManRay, Gertrude Stein, Coco Chanel, Luis Buñuel, Lee Miller, the Viscount de Noailles, among others, that formed the social circle that unfolded for ten years and where he developed his acting career.

Later career and retirement
Enrique Riveros worked in Europe as a leading man in more than fifteen films, which include Spökbaronen directed by Gustaf Edgren (1927), Majestät schneidet Bubiköpfe directed by Ragnar Hyltén-Cavallius (1928), Le tournoi dans la cite (1928) and Le bled (1929), directed by Jean Renoir, obtaining the latter film the award of the French Government at the time. In 1930, Riveros appeared as the protagonist of The Blood of a Poet,  the first film by the artist and French intellectual Jean Cocteau, this avant-garde film is considered one of the highlights of surrealism. Some of his other roles of the decade were  works in films by: Alberto Cavalcanti, Dans une île perdue (1931), À mi-chemin du ciel (1931) and Wine Cellars (1930) directed by Benito Perojo, with the actress and singer Concha Piquer as co-star and Nicole et sa vertu (1932) by Rene Hervil, among others. Before the outbreak of World War II, Enrique Riveros returned to Chile, where he worked on a couple of film projects and starred in the film El hombre que se llevaron (1946) by Jorge "Coke" Delano, with the role of defendant Alberto Rivero received the prize for Best Actor National Film. Riveros died in 1954, leaving a legacy all but forgotten.

His fame and success were so bright at the time, continuously contained in the European film magazine covers, being a gallant comparable with Rudolph Valentino. Rivero transcended fame so much in his native Chile, that in 1927 the newspaper El Mercurio sent a correspondent to interview him in Paris.

"And 1927 has brought a surprise to Parisians rise always used to seeing European artists. This year has been a South American, and something even more exotic: a Chilean, Enrique Riveros, who imposes his name on screen, movie posters and magazines in Paris. His films show him as an actor has all the powers required by the filmmaker: his youth that reaches just 20 years old, a slim athletic body, an attractive physical and strong and gifted artistic temperament "

Selected filmography
 The Ghost Baron (1927)
 The Blood of a Poet (1930)
 The Picador (1932)
 Nicole and Her Virtue (1932)

References

External links

 
Criterion Collection essay by Jean Cocteau

1906 births
1954 deaths
20th-century Chilean male actors
Chilean male film actors
Chilean male silent film actors
People from San Fernando, Chile